Ain Tammus (born 15 July 1969) is an Estonian goalkeeping coach and a former professional footballer. He is currently a goalkeeping coach at Levadia Tallinn.

International career
Tammus has represented the Estonia national football team 3 times. He made his international debut on 11 July 1997 against Latvia.

References

1969 births
Living people
Estonian footballers
FC Norma Tallinn players
FC Lantana Tallinn players
FC Flora players
Viljandi JK Tulevik players
FC TVMK players
Estonia international footballers
People from Põltsamaa
Association football goalkeepers